Polynoncus pedestris is a species of hide beetle in the subfamily Omorginae found in Argentina.

References

Polynoncus
Beetles described in 1872
Beetles of South America